Attilio Redolfi (8 September 1923 – 15 June 1997) was an Italian-French racing cyclist. He rode in the 1949 Tour de France. Italian by birth, he was naturalized French on 14 January 1949.

References

External links
 

1923 births
1997 deaths
French male cyclists
Italian male cyclists
Cyclists from Friuli Venezia Giulia
People from the Province of Pordenone